Mirpur Development Authority, located in sector F/2, is a public benefit corporation responsible for providing municipal services in Mirpur city, Azad Jammu & Kashmir's largest city. MDA was established through MDA ordinance in 1974. The authority is the successor of the Allotment Of The Land Committee which was created in 1964.

External links
 Mirpur Development Authority

Mirpur District
1974 establishments in Pakistan